"Sandcastles in the Sand" is the 16th episode in the third season of the television series How I Met Your Mother and 60th overall. It originally aired on April 21, 2008.

Plot
The episode begins with a montage of Robin from her time as Canadian bubblegum pop star Robin Sparkles. At MacLaren's, Robin announces that her former boyfriend, Simon (James Van Der Beek), will be meeting her there later. Robin describes their break-up: after she loaded his band's equipment into their van after a performance, he dumped her.

The group agrees that every time exes reunite, there is a clear winner and a clear loser. They begin to tally the points for Robin and Simon, awarding Robin five and Simon zero. Robin agrees she will be the clear winner, unless Simon got more attractive. Simon arrives and it is clear he has not: he is balding, overweight, and unfashionable. Despite this, Robin is clearly still smitten with him.

After the reunion, the group retires to Marshall and Ted's apartment. They criticize Simon's personality and how Robin handled the meeting. The group learns that Robin and Simon met after he starred in the music video for her second single, "Sandcastles in the Sand", which the group was previously unaware of. Barney immediately leaves, vowing to find the video.

When Robin attempts to defend herself, the group discusses how being around someone from your past can cause you to revert to the person you were when you knew them, a phenomenon Marshall dubs "revertigo". Marshall and Ted tell Robin that Lily suffers from this; as proof, they invite Lily's high school friend Michelle to hang out with them.

At MacLaren's the next day, Robin tells the group that Simon came to her apartment the night before to reconcile, which she accepted, to the group's dismay. Michelle arrives, and she and Lily begin speaking like excitable teenagers. Michelle, a Ph.D. student in behavioral psychology, identifies this phenomenon as "associative regression".

Mirroring their original break-up, Simon once again has Robin assist him with loading his van, then dumps her. The group attempts to console her, but fails. Robin drinks alone at MacLaren's until Barney arrives, complaining that he has yet to find a copy of her video. Realizing what Robin is upset about, Barney consoles her. She invites him to watch the music video at her place. They watch the video over and over, making fun of it, and eventually begin kissing on the couch.

Critical response

The A.V. Club gave the episode an A rating. IGN gave the episode a 9 out of 10 rating. Television Without Pity graded the episode A−.

References

External links

How I Met Your Mother (season 3) episodes
2008 American television episodes